This is a list of spider species that occur on Madagascar. Unless otherwise noted, they are endemic (they occur nowhere else). Some cosmopolitan or pantropical species that occur also in Madagascar may be missing.

Araneidae
 Acantharachne giltayi Lessert, 1938 — also Congo
 Acantharachne madecassa Emerit, 2000
 Acantharachne milloti Emerit, 2000
 Acrosomoides acrosomoides (O. P.-Cambridge, 1879)
 Arachnura scorpionoides Vinson, 1863 — also Congo, Ethiopia, Mauritius
 Araneus isabella (Vinson, 1863)
 Araneus kraepelini (Lenz, 1891)
 Araneus lenzi (Roewer, 1942)
 Araneus madagascaricus (Strand, 1908)
 Araneus margitae (Strand, 1917)
 Araneus nossibeus (Strand, 1907)
 Araneus pallescens (Lenz, 1891)
 Araneus saccalava (Strand, 1907)
 Araneus sambava (Strand, 1907)
 Argiope coquereli (Vinson, 1863) — also Zanzibar
 Argiope ranomafanensis Bjørn, 1997
 Augusta glyphica (Guérin, 1839)
 Caerostris cowani (Butler, 1882)
 Caerostris darwini (Agnarsson, Kuntner & Blackledge, 2010)
 Caerostris ecclesiigera (Butler, 1882)
 Caerostris extrusa (Butler, 1882)
 Caerostris hirsuta (Simon, 1895)
 Caerostris mitralis (Vinson, 1863) — also Central Africa
 Caerostris sexcuspidata (Fabricius, 1793) — also Africa, Comoro Islands, Aldabra
 Chorizopes antongilensis Emerit, 1997
 Chorizopes casictones Kallal & Hormiga, 2019
 Chorizopes madagascariensis Emerit, 1997
 Clitaetra perroti Simon, 1894
 Coelossia trituberculata Simon, 1903 — also Mauritius
 Cyclosa hova Strand, 1907
 Cyclosa sanctibenedicti (Vinson, 1863) — also Réunion
 Cyphalonotus columnifer Simon, 1903
 Cyrtarachne madagascariensis Emerit, 2000
 Cyrtarachne ixoides (Simon, 1870) — also Mediterranean to Georgia
 Exechocentrus lancearius Simon, 1889
 Exechocentrus madilina Scharff & Hormiga, 2012
 Gasteracantha rhomboidea madagascariensis Vinson, 1863
 Gasteracantha rufithorax Simon, 1881
 Gasteracantha sanguinolenta andrefanae Emerit, 1974
 Gasteracantha sanguinolenta bigoti Emerit, 1974
 Gasteracantha sanguinolenta mangrovae Emerit, 1974
 Gasteracantha thorelli Keyserling, 1864
 Gasteracantha versicolor avaratrae Emerit, 1974
 Gasteracantha versicolor formosa Vinson, 1863
 Isoxya cowani (Butler, 1882)
 Isoxya mahafalensis Emerit, 1974
 Isoxya milloti Emerit, 1974
 Isoxya reuteri (Lenz, 1886)
 Larinia tamatave (Grasshoff, 1971)
 Madacantha nossibeana (Strand, 1916)
 Nemoscolus waterloti Berland, 1920
 Neoscona angulatula (Schenkel, 1937) — also Aldabra, Kenya
 Neoscona cereolella (Strand, 1907) — also Congo, East Africa
 Neoscona moreli (Vinson, 1863) — also Africa, Seychelles, Réunion, Mauritius; introduced to the Caribbean, Colombia, Venezuela to Argentina
 Neoscona triangula mensamontella (Strand, 1907)
 Nephila inaurata madagascariensis (Vinson, 1863) — also South Africa to Seychelles
 Nephila komaci (Kuntner & Coddington, 2009) — also South Africa
 Nephila pilipes malagassa (Strand, 1907)
 Nephila senegalensis hildebrandti Dahl, 1912
 Nephilingis livida Vinson, 1863 — also Comoros, Mayotte and Seychelles 
 Paraplectana walleri (Blackwall, 1865) — also West, Central Africa
 Pararaneus uncivulva (Strand, 1907)
 Parmatergus coccinelloides Emerit, 1994
 Parmatergus coccinelloides ambrae Emerit, 1994
 Parmatergus lens Emerit, 1994
 Pasilobus antongilensis Emerit, 2000
 Pasilobus capuroni Emerit, 2000
 Poltys kochi Keyserling, 1864 — also Mauritius
 Poltys reuteri Lenz, 1886
 Poltys vesicularis Simon, 1889
 Prasonica albolimbata Simon, 1895 — also Congo
 Prasonica seriata Simon, 1895 — also Africa
 Prasonicella cavipalpis Grasshoff, 1971
 Pronous tetralobus Simon, 1895
 Pycnacantha fuscosa Simon, 1903
 Thelacantha brevispina (Doleschall, 1857) — also India to Philippines, Australia

Archaeidae
 Afrarchaea fisheri Lotz, 2003
 Afrarchaea godfreyi (Hewitt, 1919) — also South Africa
 Afrarchaea mahariraensis Lotz, 2003
 Eriauchenius bourgini (Millot, 1948)
 Eriauchenius jeanneli (Millot, 1948)
 Eriauchenius legendrei (Platnick, 1991)
 Eriauchenius pauliani (Legendre, 1970)
 Eriauchenius ratsirarsoni (Lotz, 2003)
 Eriauchenius tsingyensis (Lotz, 2003)
 Eriauchenius vadoni (Millot, 1948)
 Eriauchenius workmani O. P.-Cambridge, 1881
 Madagascarchaea gracilicollis (Millot, 1948)

Barychelidae
 Idioctis intertidalis (Benoit & Legendre, 1968) — also Seychelles
 Tigidia alluaudi (Simon, 1902)
 Tigidia bastardi (Simon, 1902)
 Tigidia dubia (Strand, 1907)
 Tigidia majori (Pocock, 1903)
 Tigidia mathiauxi (Simon, 1902)
 Tigidia processigera (Strand, 1907)
 Tigidia typica (Strand, 1907)
 Zophoryctes flavopilosus Simon, 1902

Clubionidae
 Carteronius argenticomus (Keyserling, 1877)
 Carteronius vittiger Simon, 1896
 Clubiona hoffmanni Schenkel, 1937

Corinnidae
 Castianeira majungae Simon, 1896
 Cetonana aculifera (Strand, 1916)
 Copa auroplumosa Strand, 1907
 Copa lineata Simon, 1903
 Corinna nossibeensis Strand, 1907
 Orthobula sicca Simon, 1903
 Paccius angulatus Platnick, 2000
 Paccius elevatus Platnick, 2000
 Paccius griswoldi Platnick, 2000
 Paccius madagascariensis (Simon, 1889)
 Paccius mucronatus Simon, 1898
 Paccius quinteri Platnick, 2000
 Paccius scharffi Platnick, 2000

Ctenidae
 Mahafalytenus fo Silva, 2007
 Mahafalytenus fohy Silva, 2007
 Mahafalytenus hafa Silva, 2007
 Mahafalytenus isalo Silva, 2007
 Mahafalytenus osy Silva, 2007
 Mahafalytenus paosy Silva, 2007
 Mahafalytenus tsilo Silva, 2007
 Viridasius fasciatus (Lenz, 1886)
 Vulsor isaloensis (Ono, 1993)
 Vulsor penicillatus Simon, 1896
 Vulsor quartus Strand, 1907
 Vulsor quintus Strand, 1907
 Vulsor septimus Strand, 1907
 Vulsor sextus Strand, 1907

Cyatholipidae
 Alaranea alba Griswold, 1997
 Alaranea ardua Griswold, 1997
 Alaranea betsileo Griswold, 1997
 Alaranea merina Griswold, 1997
 Ulwembua antsiranana Griswold, 1997
 Ulwembua nigra Griswold, 2001
 Ulwembua ranomafana Griswold, 1997
 Vazaha toamasina Griswold, 1997

Deinopidae
 Deinopis madagascariensis Lenz, 1886

Desidae
 Desis crosslandi Pocock, 1902 — also Zanzibar

Dipluridae
 Thelechoris rutenbergi Karsch, 1881
 Thelechoris striatipes (Simon, 1889) — also East, Southern Africa

Eresidae
 Stegodyphus mimosarum Pavesi, 1883 — also Africa
 Stegodyphus simplicifrons Simon, 1906

Filistatidae
 Andoharano decaryi (Fage, 1945)
 Andoharano grandidieri (Simon, 1901)
 Andoharano milloti Legendre, 1971
 Andoharano monodi Legendre, 1971

Gallieniellidae
 Gallieniella betroka Platnick, 1984
 Gallieniella blanci Platnick, 1984
 Gallieniella mygaloides Millot, 1947
 Legendrena angavokely Platnick, 1984
 Legendrena perinet Platnick, 1984
 Legendrena rolandi Platnick, 1984
 Legendrena rothi Platnick, 1995
 Legendrena spiralis Platnick, 1995
 Legendrena steineri Platnick, 1990
 Legendrena tamatave Platnick, 1984

Gnaphosidae
 Camillina fiana Platnick & Murphy, 1987 — also Comoro Islands
 Camillina tsima Platnick & Murphy, 1987
 Drassodes malagassicus (Butler, 1879)
 Poecilochroa malagassa Strand, 1907
 Scotophaeus nossibeensis Strand, 1907
 Zelotes bastardi (Simon, 1896)
 Zelotes madagascaricus (Strand, 1907)

Hersiliidae
 Hersilia eloetsensis Foord & Dippenaar-Schoeman, 2006
 Hersilia fossulata Karsch, 1881
 Hersilia insulana Strand, 1907
 Hersilia madagascariensis (Wunderlich, 2004) — also Comoro Islands
 Hersilia tamatavensis Foord & Dippenaar-Schoeman, 2006
 Hersilia vinsoni Lucas, 1869

Idiopidae
 Genysa bicalcarata Simon, 1889
 Genysa decorsei (Simon, 1902)
 Hiboka geayi Fage, 1922

Linyphiidae
 Helsdingenia extensa (Locket, 1968) — also St. Helena, Africa, Comoro Islands
 Microlinyphia simoni van Helsdingen, 1970
 Thapsagus pulcher Simon, 1894
 Thyreobaeus scutiger Simon, 1889
 Tmeticides araneiformis Strand, 1907

Liocranidae
 Donuea decorsei (Simon, 1903)

Lycosidae
 Arctosa atroventrosa (Lenz, 1886)
 Geolycosa nossibeensis (Strand, 1907)
 Geolycosa urbana hova (Strand, 1907)
 Hognoides urbanides (Strand, 1907)
 Lycosa madagascariensis Vinson, 1863
 Lycosa signata Lenz, 1886
 Ocyale fera Strand, 1908
 Pardosa cinerascens (Roewer, 1951)
 Pardosa vinsoni (Roewer, 1951)
 Pardosa zorimorpha (Strand, 1907)
 Tricassa madagascariensis Jocqué & Alderweireldt, 2001

Migidae
 Micromesomma cowani Pocock, 1895
 Paramigas alluaudi (Simon, 1903)
 Paramigas andasibe Raven, 2001
 Paramigas goodmani Griswold & Ledford, 2001
 Paramigas macrops Griswold & Ledford, 2001
 Paramigas manakambus Griswold & Ledford, 2001
 Paramigas milloti Griswold & Ledford, 2001
 Paramigas oracle Griswold & Ledford, 2001
 Paramigas pauliani (Dresco & Canard, 1975)
 Paramigas pectinatus Griswold & Ledford, 2001
 Paramigas perroti (Simon, 1891)
 Paramigas rothorum Griswold & Ledford, 2001
 Thyropoeus malagasus (Strand, 1908)
 Thyropoeus mirandus Pocock, 1895

Mimetidae
 Ero lokobeana Emerit, 1996
 Ero madagascariensis Emerit, 1996
 Mimetus madacassus Emerit, 1996

Miturgidae
 Cheiracanthium insulare (Vinson, 1863) — also Réunion
 Cheiracanthium leucophaeum Simon, 1897

Nemesiidae
 Entypesa annulipes (Strand, 1907)
 Entypesa nebulosa Simon, 1902

Oxyopidae
 Hostus paroculus Simon, 1898
 Oxyopes dumonti (Vinson, 1863) — also East Africa to Seychelles
 Oxyopes pallidecoloratus Strand, 1906 — also Ethiopia, Congo, East Africa
 Peucetia lucasi (Vinson, 1863) — also Comoro Islands
 Peucetia madagascariensis (Vinson, 1863) — also Comoro Islands

Philodromidae
 Philodromus niveus Vinson, 1863
 Thanatus philodromicus Strand, 1916

Pholcidae
 Crossopriza nigrescens Millot, 1946
 Leptopholcus sakalavensis Millot, 1946
 Paramicromerys betsileo Huber, 2003
 Paramicromerys coddingtoni Huber, 2003
 Paramicromerys combesi (Millot, 1946)
 Paramicromerys madagascariensis (Simon, 1893)
 Paramicromerys mahira Huber, 2003
 Paramicromerys manantenina Huber, 2003
 Paramicromerys marojejy Huber, 2003
 Paramicromerys megaceros (Millot, 1946)
 Paramicromerys nampoinai Huber, 2003
 Paramicromerys quinteri Huber, 2003
 Paramicromerys rabeariveloi Huber, 2003
 Paramicromerys ralamboi Huber, 2003
 Paramicromerys rothorum Huber, 2003
 Paramicromerys scharffi Huber, 2003
 Pholcus lambertoni Millot, 1946
 Smeringopus madagascariensis Millot, 1946
 Spermophora ranomafana Huber, 2003
 Spermophora vyvato Huber, 2003
 Zatavua analalava Huber, 2003
 Zatavua andrei (Millot, 1946)
 Zatavua ankaranae (Millot, 1946)
 Zatavua fagei (Millot, 1946)
 Zatavua griswoldi Huber, 2003
 Zatavua imerinensis (Millot, 1946)
 Zatavua impudica (Millot, 1946)
 Zatavua isalo Huber, 2003
 Zatavua kely Huber, 2003
 Zatavua madagascariensis (Fage, 1945)
 Zatavua mahafaly Huber, 2003
 Zatavua punctata (Millot, 1946)
 Zatavua talatakely Huber, 2003
 Zatavua tamatave Huber, 2003
 Zatavua voahangyae Huber, 2003
 Zatavua vohiparara Huber, 2003
 Zatavua zanahary Huber, 2003

Phyxelididae
 Ambohima pauliani Griswold, 1990
 Ambohima sublima Griswold, 1990
 Phyxelida fanivelona Griswold, 1990
 Phyxelida malagasyana Griswold, 1990

Pisauridae
 Caripetella madagascariensis (Lenz, 1886) — also Comoro Islands
 Dolomedes saccalavus Strand, 1907
 Hala impigra Jocqué, 1994
 Hala paulyi Jocqué, 1994
 Hygropoda madagascarica Strand, 1907
 Hypsithylla linearis Simon, 1903
 Maypacius bilineatus (Pavesi, 1895) — also Central, East Africa
 Maypacius vittiger Simon, 1898
 Paracladycnis vis Blandin, 1979
 Ransonia mahasoana Blandin, 1979
 Tallonia picta Simon, 1889
 Thalassiopsis vachoni Roewer, 1955
 Thalassius esimoni Sierwald, 1984
 Thalassius leoninus Strand, 1916
 Thalassius majungensis Strand, 1907
 Tolma toreuta Jocqué, 1994

Salticidae
 Asemonea ornatissima Peckham & Wheeler, 1889
 Bavia albolineata Peckham & Peckham, 1885
 Beata lineata (Vinson, 1863)
 Brettus madagascarensis (Peckham & Peckham, 1903)
 Carrhotus harringtoni Prószynski, 1992
 Cyrba legendrei Wanless, 1984 — also Comoro Islands
 Echinussa imerinensis Simon, 1901
 Echinussa praedatoria (Keyserling, 1877)
 Echinussa vibrabunda (Simon, 1886)
 Evarcha madagascariensis Prószynski, 1992
 Goleba lyra Maddison & Zhang, 2006
 Goleba punctata (Peckham & Wheeler, 1888)
 Goleta peckhami Simon, 1900
 Goleta workmani (Peckham & Peckham, 1885)
 Harmochirus bianoriformis (Strand, 1907) — also Central, East Africa
 Heliophanus hamifer Simon, 1886 — also Mozambique, Zimbabwe, Seychelles
 Heliophanus imerinensis Simon, 1901
 Heliophanus innominatus Wesolowska, 1986
 Heliophanus modicus Peckham & Peckham, 1903 — also South Africa
 Heliophanus mucronatus Simon, 1901
 Heliophanus orchesta Simon, 1886 — also Central, South Africa
 Hispo cingulata Simon, 1886
 Hispo frenata (Simon, 1900)
 Hispo macfarlanei Wanless, 1981
 Hispo pullata Wanless, 1981
 Hispo sulcata Wanless, 1981
 Hispo tenuis Wanless, 1981
 Hyllus albomarginatus (Lenz, 1886)
 Hyllus albooculatus (Vinson, 1863)
 Hyllus bifasciatus Ono, 1993
 Hyllus interrogationis (Strand, 1907)
 Hyllus lugubrellus Strand, 1908
 Hyllus lugubris (Vinson, 1863)
 Hyllus madagascariensis (Vinson, 1863)
 Hyllus nossibeensis Strand, 1907
 Hyllus vinsoni (Peckham & Peckham, 1885)
 Hyllus virgillus Strand, 1907
 Macopaeus spinosus Simon, 1900
 Meleon madagascarensis (Wanless, 1978)
 Meleon russata (Simon, 1900)
 Myrmarachne andringitra Wanless, 1978
 Myrmarachne augusta (Peckham & Peckham, 1892)
 Myrmarachne cowani (Peckham & Peckham, 1892)
 Myrmarachne diegoensis Wanless, 1978
 Myrmarachne electrica (Peckham & Peckham, 1892)
 Myrmarachne eugenei Wanless, 1978
 Myrmarachne eumenes (Simon, 1900)
 Myrmarachne longiventris (Simon, 1903)
 Myrmarachne mahasoa Wanless, 1978
 Myrmarachne nubilis Wanless, 1978
 Myrmarachne peckhami Roewer, 1951
 Myrmarachne ransoni Wanless, 1978
 Myrmarachne simplexella Roewer, 1951
 Myrmarachne volatilis (Peckham & Peckham, 1892) — also China, Vietnam
 Natta chionogaster (Simon, 1901) — also Africa
 Pachypoessa lacertosa Simon, 1902 — also Southern Africa
 Padilla armata Peckham & Peckham, 1894
 Padilla cornuta (Peckham & Peckham, 1885)
 Padilla glauca Simon, 1900
 Padilla lancearia Simon, 1900
 Padilla mantis Simon, 1900
 Padilla sartor Simon, 1900
 Pandisus decorus Wanless, 1980
 Pandisus modestus (Peckham & Wheeler, 1889)
 Pandisus parvulus Wanless, 1980
 Pandisus sarae Wanless, 1980
 Pandisus scalaris Simon, 1900
 Pharacocerus ebenauensis Strand, 1908
 Pharacocerus sessor Simon, 1902
 Phaulostylus furcifer Simon, 1902
 Phaulostylus grammicus Simon, 1902
 Phaulostylus grandidieri Simon, 1902
 Phaulostylus leucolophus Simon, 1902
 Pochyta albimana Simon, 1902
 Poessa argenteofrenata Simon, 1902
 Portia schultzi Karsch, 1878 — also Central, East, Southern Africa
 Pseudicius unicus (Peckham & Peckham, 1894)
 Quekettia georgius (Peckham & Peckham, 1892)
 Salticus coronatus (Camboué, 1887)
 Thyene inflata (Gerstäcker, 1873) — also Africa
 Thyene tamatavi (Vinson, 1863)
 Thyene varians Peckham & Peckham, 1901
 Tomocyrba andasibe Maddison & Zhang, 2006
 Tomocyrba barbata Simon, 1900
 Tomocyrba decollata Simon, 1900

Scytodidae
 Scytodes oswaldi Lenz, 1891

Segestriidae
 Segestria madagascarensis Keyserling, 1877

Selenopidae
 Anyphops benoiti Corronca, 1998
 Garcorops madagascar Corronca, 2003
 Garcorops paulyi Corronca, 2003
 Hovops betsileo Corronca & Rodríguez Artigas, 2011
 Hovops dufouri (Vinson, 1863) — also Réunion
 Hovops legrasi (Simon, 1887)
 Hovops lidiae Corronca & Rodríguez Artigas, 2011
 Hovops madagascariensis (Vinson, 1863)
 Hovops mariensis (Strand, 1908)
 Hovops merina Corronca & Rodríguez Artigas, 2011
 Hovops modestus (Lenz, 1886)
 Hovops pusillus (Simon, 1887)
 Selenops ivohibe Corronca, 2005
 Selenops vigilans Pocock, 1898 — also West, Central, East Africa

Sparassidae
 Chrosioderma albidum Simon, 1897
 Chrosioderma analalava Silva, 2005
 Chrosioderma havia Silva, 2005
 Chrosioderma mahavelona Silva, 2005
 Chrosioderma mipentinapentina Silva, 2005
 Chrosioderma namoroka Silva, 2005
 Chrosioderma ranomafana Silva, 2005
 Chrosioderma roaloha Silva, 2005
 Chrosioderma soalala Silva, 2005
 Damastes atrignathus Strand, 1908
 Damastes coquereli Simon, 1880
 Damastes coquereli affinis Strand, 1907
 Damastes decoratus (Simon, 1897)
 Damastes fasciolatus (Simon, 1903)
 Damastes flavomaculatus Simon, 1880
 Damastes grandidieri Simon, 1880
 Damastes majungensis Strand, 1907
 Damastes malagassus (Fage, 1926)
 Damastes malagasus (Karsch, 1881)
 Damastes masculinus Strand, 1908
 Damastes nossibeensis Strand, 1907
 Damastes oswaldi Lenz, 1891
 Damastes pallidus (Schenkel, 1937)
 Damastes sikoranus Strand, 1906
 Eusparassus laterifuscus Strand, 1908
 Megaloremmius leo Simon, 1903
 Olios coenobitus Fage, 1926
 Olios erraticus Fage, 1926
 Olios lamarcki (Latreille, 1806) — also Madagascar to Sri Lanka, India
 Olios malagassus Strand, 1907
 Olios malagassus septifer Strand, 1908
 Olios mordax (O. P.-Cambridge, 1899)
 Olios nossibeensis Strand, 1907
 Olios pusillus Simon, 1880
 Olios subpusillus Strand, 1907
 Palystes convexus Strand, 1907
 Palystes spiralis Strand, 1907
 Rhitymna hildebrandti Järvi, 1914
 Rhitymna imerinensis (Vinson, 1863)
 Staianus acuminatus Simon, 1889

Stiphidiidae
 Ischalea incerta (O. P.-Cambridge, 1877)

Synaphridae
 Africepheia madagascariensis Miller, 2007
 Synaphris schlingeri Miller, 2007
 Synaphris toliara Miller, 2007

Tengellidae
 Calamistrula evanescens Dahl, 1901

Tetrablemmidae
 Shearella browni (Shear, 1978)

Tetragnathidae
 Diphya pumila Simon, 1888
 Leucauge lechei Strand, 1908
 Leucauge tetragnathella Strand, 1907
 Leucauge undulata (Vinson, 1863) — also Ethiopia, East Africa, Rodrigues Island
 Orsinome vorkampiana Strand, 1907
 Pachygnatha longipes Simon, 1894
 Tetragnatha protensa Walckenaer, 1842 — also Madagascar to Australia, New Caledonia, Palau

Theraphosidae
 Encyocrates raffrayi Simon, 1892
 Monocentropus lambertoni Fage, 1922
 Phoneyusa bouvieri Berland, 1917

Theridiidae
 Anelosimus andasibe Agnarsson & Kuntner, 2005
 Anelosimus decaryi (Fage, 1930) — also Aldabra
 Anelosimus may Agnarsson, 2005
 Anelosimus nazariani Agnarsson & Kuntner, 2005
 Anelosimus sallee Agnarsson & Kuntner, 2005
 Anelosimus salut Agnarsson & Kuntner, 2005
 Anelosimus vondrona Agnarsson & Kuntner, 2005
 Argyrodes abscissus O. P.-Cambridge, 1880
 Argyrodes meus Strand, 1907
 Argyrodes minax O. P.-Cambridge, 1880 — also Comoro Islands
 Argyrodes sextuberculosus Strand, 1908 — also Mozambique
 Argyrodes viridis (Vinson, 1863) — also Réunion
 Argyrodes zonatus (Walckenaer, 1842) — also East Africa, Réunion, Bioko
 Asygyna coddingtoni Agnarsson, 2006
 Asygyna huberi Agnarsson, 2006
 Crustulina ambigua Simon, 1889
 Dipoena transversisulcata Strand, 1908
 Latrodectus menavodi Vinson, 1863 — also Comoro Islands
 Latrodectus obscurior Dahl, 1902 — also Cape Verde Islands
 Phoroncidia aurata O. P.-Cambridge, 1877
 Phoroncidia quadrispinella Strand, 1907
 Phoroncidia rubroargentea Berland, 1913
 Phycosoma excisum (Simon, 1889)
 Theridion decemperlatum (Simon, 1889)
 Theridion lacticolor Berland, 1920 — also Kenya, Yemen
 Theridion quadrilineatum Lenz, 1886
 Theridula perlata Simon, 1889
 Theridula theriella Strand, 1907
 Thwaitesia argenteosquamata (Lenz, 1891)
 Thwaitesia aureosignata (Lenz, 1891)
 Thwaitesia pulcherrima Butler, 1882
 Tidarren apartiolum Knoflach & van Harten, 2006
 Tidarren dasyglossa Knoflach & van Harten, 2006
 Tidarren ephemerum Knoflach & van Harten, 2006
 Tidarren horaki Knoflach & van Harten, 2006
 Tidarren obtusum Knoflach & van Harten, 2006

Thomisidae
 Apyretina catenulata (Simon, 1903)
 Apyretina nigra (Simon, 1903)
 Apyretina pentagona (Simon, 1895)
 Apyretina quinquenotata (Simon, 1903)
 Apyretina tessera (Simon, 1903)
 Cyriogonus fuscitarsis Strand, 1908
 Cyriogonus lactifer Simon, 1886
 Cyriogonus rutenbergi (Karsch, 1881)
 Cyriogonus simoni Lenz, 1891
 Cyriogonus triquetrus Simon, 1886
 Cyriogonus vinsoni (Thorell, 1875)
 Diaea nakajimai Ono, 1993
 Diplotychus longulus Simon, 1903
 Emplesiogonus scutulatus Simon, 1903
 Emplesiogonus striatus Simon, 1903
 Firmicus bimaculatus (Simon, 1886)
 Geraesta bilobata Simon, 1897
 Geraesta hirta Simon, 1889
 Herbessus decorsei Simon, 1903
 Iphoctesis echinipes Simon, 1903
 Lampertia pulchra Strand, 1907
 Phrynarachne clavigera Simon, 1903
 Phrynarachne pusiola Simon, 1903
 Phrynarachne rugosa (Latreille, 1804) — also West Africa, Malawi, Mauritius, Réunion
 Plastonomus octoguttatus Simon, 1903
 Pseudoporrhopis granum Simon, 1886
 Pyresthesis laevis (Keyserling, 1877)
 Runcinia oculifrons Strand, 1907
 Soelteria nigra Dahl, 1907
 Stephanopis octolobata Simon, 1886
 Stephanopis rhomboidalis Simon, 1886
 Synema hildebrandti Dahl, 1907
 Synema lunulatum Dahl, 1907
 Synema obscurifrons Dahl, 1907
 Synema obscuripes Dahl, 1907
 Tharrhalea cerussata Simon, 1886
 Tharrhalea semiargentea Simon, 1895
 Tharrhalea superpicta Simon, 1886
 Thomisus boesenbergi Lenz, 1891
 Thomisus lamperti Strand, 1907
 Thomisus madagascariensis Comellini, 1957
 Thomisus madagascariensis pallidus Comellini, 1957
 Thomisus nossibeensis Strand, 1907
 Trichopagis manicata Simon, 1886 — also Gabon, Guinea, South Africa
 Xysticus hepaticus Simon, 1903

Trochanteriidae
 Platyoides grandidieri Simon, 1903 — also Kenya, Aldabra, Réunion
 Platyoides mailaka Platnick, 1985
 Platyoides velonus Platnick, 1985

Udubidae
 Uduba dahli Simon, 1903
 Uduba madagascariensis (Vinson, 1863)
 Zorodictyna inhonesta (Simon, 1906)
 Zorodictyna oswaldi (Lenz, 1891)

Uloboridae
 Uloborus aureus Vinson, 1863
 Uloborus vanillarum Vinson, 1863
 Uloborus velutinus Butler, 1882

Zodariidae
 Aschema madagascariensis (Strand, 1907)
 Aschema pallida Jocqué, 1991
 Diores anomalus Jocqué, 1990
 Diores milloti Jocqué, 1990
 Madrela angusta (Simon, 1889)
 Madrela madrela Jocqué, 1991

References
  (2007): The world spider catalog, version 8.0. American Museum of Natural History.
 Corronca, J.A. & Rodríguez Artigas, S.M. 2011. New species of the Madagascan genus Hovops Benoit, 1968 (Araneae: Selenopidae), with a description of the H. madagascariensis male and an identification key. African Invertebrates 52 (2): 295-310.

Madagascar
'
Spiders

Madagascar
Spiders of Madagascar